"Cracking Up" is a song by the Scottish alternative rock group The Jesus and Mary Chain and the first (new) single from the group's album Munki. It was released by Creation Records in April 1998 and reached #35 in the UK single charts.

Track listing
All tracks written by William Reid, except where noted.

7" (CRE 292) 
"Cracking Up" - 4:43
"Rocket" (Ben Lurie) - 3:00

CDS (CRESCD 292)
"Cracking Up" - 4:43
"Hide Myself" (Jim Reid) - 3:30
"Rocket" (Lurie) - 3:00
"Commercial" - 3:24

Personnel

The Jesus and Mary Chain
 Jim Reid - Guitar, production
 William Reid - Lead vocals, guitar, production
 Ben Lurie - bass, guitar 
 Nick Sanderson - drums

Additional personnel
 Dick Meaney - engineer

References

The Jesus and Mary Chain songs
1998 singles
Songs written by Jim Reid
Songs written by William Reid (musician)
Creation Records singles
1998 songs